Peter Collins Dorsey (March 24, 1931 – January 20, 2012) was a United States district judge of the United States District Court for the District of Connecticut.

Education

Born in New London, Connecticut, Dorsey received a Bachelor of Arts degree from Yale University in 1953, and a Bachelor of Laws from Harvard Law School in 1959. He was in the United States Naval Reserve from 1953 to 1956.

Career

Dorsey was in private practice in New Haven, Connecticut from 1959 to 1974. He was the United States Attorney for the District of Connecticut from 1974 to 1977. He returned to private practice in New Haven from 1977 to 1983.

Federal judicial service

Dorsey was nominated by President Ronald Reagan on June 7, 1983, to a seat vacated by Judge T. Emmet Clarie. He was confirmed by the United States Senate on July 18, 1983, and received commission on July 19, 1983. He served as Chief Judge from 1994 to 1998. He assumed senior status on January 2, 1998.

Death

Dorsey died after a long illness on January 20, 2012, in New Haven, aged 80.

References

Sources
 

1931 births
2012 deaths
Harvard Law School alumni
Judges of the United States District Court for the District of Connecticut
People from New London, Connecticut
United States Attorneys for the District of Connecticut
United States district court judges appointed by Ronald Reagan
20th-century American judges
United States Navy reservists
Yale University alumni